Lachnaia cylindrica is a species of leaf beetles from the subfamily Cryptocephalinae. It is found on the Iberian Peninsula and in southern France, southern Italy, on Sicily and in Algeria.

References

Clytrini
Beetles described in 1848
Taxa named by Jean Théodore Lacordaire